The New York City Subway is a rapid transit system that serves four of the five boroughs of New York City in the U.S. state of New York: the Bronx, Brooklyn, Manhattan, and Queens. Operated by the New York City Transit Authority under the Metropolitan Transportation Authority of New York, the New York City Subway is the busiest rapid transit system in the United States and the seventh busiest in the world, with 5.225 million daily riders. The system's  stations qualifies it to have the largest number of rapid transit stations in the world.

Three rapid transit companies merged in 1940 to create the present New York City Subway system: the Interborough Rapid Transit Company (IRT), the Brooklyn–Manhattan Transit Corporation (BMT), and the Independent Subway System (IND).

Stations with the same name along the same services 

Many stations share the same name. These stations are disambiguated by the line each of them is on. The following stations are served by the same numbered or lettered trains.

 The 5 on each of its two northern branches in the Bronx stops at two stations that bear the same name: Gun Hill Road on the Dyre Avenue Line and the White Plains Road Line, and Pelham Parkway on the Dyre Avenue Line and the White Plains Road Line.
 The B stops at two stations named Seventh Avenue, located along the BMT Brighton Line in Brooklyn and the IND Sixth Avenue Line in Manhattan.
 The D stops at three stations with 50th Street in the name: 47th–50th Streets–Rockefeller Center on the IND Sixth Avenue Line in Manhattan, 50th Street on the West End Line in Brooklyn, and Bay 50th Street, also on the West End Line.
 The E stops at two stations with 23rd Street in the name: 23rd Street on the Eighth Avenue Line in Manhattan and Court Square–23rd Street on the Queens Boulevard Line in Queens.
 The M stops at two stations with Myrtle Avenue in the name: Myrtle Avenue on the BMT Jamaica Line and Myrtle–Wyckoff Avenues on the BMT Myrtle Avenue Line, both in Brooklyn. It also stops at two stations with 23rd Street in the name: 23rd Street along the Sixth Avenue Line in Manhattan and Court Square–23rd Street on the Queens Boulevard Line in Queens.
 The N stops at two stations with Astoria in the name: Astoria Boulevard and Astoria–Ditmars Boulevard, located adjacent to one another on the BMT Astoria Line.
 The R stops at two stations with 36th Street in the name: one along the Fourth Avenue Line in Brooklyn and one along the Queens Boulevard Line in Queens.

Lists of stations by borough
The four lists of New York City Subway stations by borough have additional details regarding services, accessibility, and transfers.
 List of New York City Subway stations in the Bronx
 List of New York City Subway stations in Brooklyn
 List of New York City Subway stations in Manhattan
 List of New York City Subway stations in Queens

List of stations

Permanently closed subway stations, including those that have been demolished, are not included in the list below.
Colorboxes depict trunk line stations in Manhattan.

List of station complexes with differing station names

See also

Notes

References

 
New York City-related lists
New York City
Sub